The Fourteenth Street Theatre was a New York City theatre located at 107 West 14th Street just west of Sixth Avenue.

History 
It was designed by Alexander Saeltzer and opened in 1866 as the Theatre Francais, as a home for French language dramas and opera.

The theatre was renamed the Lyceum in 1871. In 1879, it was taken over by producer J.H. Haverly who renamed it Haverly's 14th Street Theatre.  By the mid-1880s, it had become simply the Fourteenth Street Theatre.

By the mid-1910s it was being used as a movie theatre, until actress Eva Le Gallienne made it the home of her stage company and renamed it to Civic Repertory Theatre in 1926.  She mounted 34 successful productions at the theatre, but the Great Depression ended that venture in 1934.

The building was demolished in 1938.

Selected productions

14th Street Theatre
Evangeline! (1885–1886) (252 perf.)
The Still Alarm (1887)
The Old Homestead (1887, by Denman Thompson) (155 perf.)
A Romance of Athlone (1889, 1890, by Chauncey Olcott)
Blue Jeans (1890)
Mavourneen (1891)

Civic Repertory Theatre
Alice in Wonderland (1932–33, adapted by Eva Le Gallienne) (127 perf.)
Peace on Earth (1933–34, by George Sklar and Albert Maltz) (126 perf.)
Let Freedom Ring (1935–36) (108 perf.)

References
Notes

Bibliography
Brockett, Oscar G. History of the Theatre, Second Edition. Boston, Allyn and Bacon, 1974.

External links
Listing on the Internet Broadway Database
Civic Repertory Theatre Records. Yale Collection of American Literature, Beinecke Rare Book and Manuscript Library.

Former theatres in Manhattan
Demolished theatres in New York City
Demolished buildings and structures in Manhattan
14th Street (Manhattan)
Buildings and structures demolished in 1938